Clube Atlético Pimentense, commonly referred to as Pimentense, is a Brazilian football club based in Pimenta Bueno, Rondônia. The club competes in the Campeonato Rondoniense Série A, the top division in the Rondônia state football league system.

History
The club was founded on 8 March 1987.

Stadium
Clube Atlético Pimentense play their home games at Estádio Luiz Alves Athaíde. The stadium has a maximum capacity of 3,000 people.

References

Association football clubs established in 1987
Football clubs in Rondônia
1987 establishments in Brazil